Jesús Blanco Villar (born 26 March 1963) is a Spanish former professional racing cyclist. He rode in three editions of the Tour de France, one edition of the Giro d'Italia and ten editions of the Vuelta a España.

References

External links
 

1963 births
Living people
Spanish male cyclists
Sportspeople from A Coruña
Cyclists from Galicia (Spain)